The 1973 Torneo Godó – Singles was an event of the 1973 Torneo Godó tennis tournament and was played on outdoor clay courts at the Real Club de Tenis Barcelona in Barcelona, Spain between 8 October and 14 October 1973. Jan Kodeš was the defending Torneo Godó champion but was defeated in the semifinals. First-seeded Ilie Năstase won the title by defeating second-seeded Manuel Orantes in the final, 2–6, 6–1, 8–6, 6–4.

Seeds

Draw

Finals

Top half

Section 1

Section 2

Bottom half

Section 3

Section 4

References

External links
 ITF tournament edition details

1973 Grand Prix (tennis)